Jake Kambos (born 24 May 1999) is a Greece international rugby league footballer.

Playing career
In 2022, Kambos was named in the Greece squad for the 2021 Rugby League World Cup, the first ever Greek Rugby League squad to compete in a World Cup.

References

External links
Greece profile
Greek profile

1996 births
Living people
Australian rugby league players
Australian people of Greek descent
Greece national rugby league team players